Leon B. Lucy (1938–2018) was a British-American astrophysicist, best known for his contribution to the Richardson-Lucy deconvolution algorithm.

Links 

Columbia University faculty
1938 births
2018 deaths